T. juncea may refer to:

 Tetrarrhena juncea, a true grass
 Tetratheca juncea, a shrub endemic to New South Wales
 Tillandsia juncea, a New World plant
 Typha juncea, a wetland plant